Bargi Matal District (Barge Matal District, Bragamatal District, Kamkata-vari: ,) is a district of Nuristan Province, Afghanistan.  It was originally in Konarha Province (Konar Province) and then was moved to the newly created Nuristan Province in 2001.

Climate
Bargi Matal has a humid continental climate (Köppen: Dfb) with a subarctic (Köppen: Dfc) tendencies, resulting in long, cold winters and short, mild summers.

Boundaries
Bargi Matal District is bounded by:
 Kuran wa Munjan District of Badakhshan Province to the west and northwest,
 Chitral District of Khyber-Pakhtunkhwa Province, Pakistan, to the northeast and east,
 Kamdesh District to the south, and
 Parun District to the southwest.

See also
 Peshawar, Afghanistan, a settlement in the district

Notes

External links
 Crowley, Michael (22 September 2009) "Dying For Barge Matal" The New Republic
 Cavendish, Julius (13 November 2009) "Barge Matal: It's a Place We Never Want to Go Back To", The Independent

Districts of Nuristan Province